Montauk Air Force Station was a US military base at Montauk Point on the eastern tip of Long Island, New York. It was decommissioned in 1981 and is now owned by the New York State Office of Parks, Recreation and Historic Preservation as Camp Hero State Park.

History 
The eastern tip of Long Island has always had strategic significance, even in the days of the American Revolution. When the Montauk Lighthouse was first authorized in 1792, part of its mission was to keep a lookout for British ships sailing for New York or Boston, and as such was the first military installation at Montauk.

Montauk was always considered a prime location for a possible invasion because of its remoteness and prime location midway between two major American cities. During World War I, the Navy established Naval Air Station Montauk in August, 1917, commanded by LT Marc Mitscher. Reconnaissance dirigibles, an airplane, troops and Coast Guard personnel were stationed at Montauk.

World War II 
Fort Hero was established in 1942 on the point just south of the Montauk lighthouse. The fort was named after Major General Andrew Hero, Jr., who was the Army's Chief of Coast Artillery between 1926 and 1930. He died in 1942.

In World War II, with German U-boats threatening the East Coast and Long Island, Montauk was again considered a likely invasion point. The US Army upgraded Fort Hero, and renamed it Camp Hero in 1942. The Navy also acquired land in the area, including Fort Pond Bay and Montauk Manor. They built docks, seaplane hangars, barracks, and other buildings in the area. There was also a huge torpedo testing facility.

The whole facility, with Army, Navy and Coast Guard constituents, was officially known as the "US Military Reservation" but the locals just called it "Camp Hero". 

These batteries rendered obsolete almost all previous heavy guns in the Harbor Defenses of Long Island Sound. They were designated with battery construction numbers 112 and 113, Battery 113 was also known as Battery Dunn. A two-gun 6-inch battery, Battery 216, was also built. The coastal gun emplacements were camouflaged with netting and foliage. A large "Fire Control Center" was built next to the lighthouse to direct the artillery and anti-aircraft guns. Other armaments included quadruple .50 caliber machine guns for low altitude defense, and 90 mm and 120 mm anti-aircraft guns. The camp was a self-contained town with recreational facilities, barracks and its own power station.

Camp Hero was also used as a training facility and a target range, with guns being fired at offshore targets.

To protect it from enemy bombers and German spies in fishing boats, the entire base was built to look like a typical New England fishing village. Concrete bunkers had windows painted on them and ornamental roofs with fake dormers. The gymnasium was made to look like a church with a faux steeple.

When World War II ended, the base was temporarily shut down and used as a training facility by the Army Reserve. The naval facilities were largely abandoned and the gun emplacements were dismantled in 1949.

Cold War 
After the 1948 Berlin Blockade in Germany, the Cold War began in earnest.  This event, coupled with the advent of the Soviet Tupolev Tu-4 intercontinental bomber in 1947, created serious concern about the possibility of a Soviet air attack on the continental United States.  This spurred the United States Air Force (USAF) to direct its Air Defense Command (ADC) to take radar sets out of storage for operation in the Northeastern United States in 1948.  By August of that year, a radar station had been placed at Lashup Site L-10 at Montauk, NY. This program was appropriately named "Lashup"

As part of this temporary network, ADC placed an AN/TPS-1B long-range search radar at Fort Hero in June 1948 and designated the site as Montauk Point, L-10. The Montauk site fed into a primitive control center established at Roslyn AFS, New York. In 1950 it  activated the 773d Aircraft Control and Warning Squadron (AC&W Sq) to operate the facility.  On 1 December 1953, the site designation was changed to LP-45 and the Air Force facilities were renamed Montauk Air Force Station. Montauk AFS was incorporated into the permanent ADC network of General Surveillance Radar Stations.

With the establishment of a permanent presence, ADC equipped the site with AN/CPS-5 and AN/TPS-10A height-finder radars. A year later AN/FPS-3 and AN/FPS-5 radars were operating. Between 1955 and 1956 an AN/FPS-8/GPS-3 made an appearance at the tip of the site.  In the spring of 1957 Montauk AFS received one of the first AN/FPS-20 units along with a pair of AN/FPS-6 height-finder radars.

In November 1957, the Army closed the Camp Hero portion of the military reservation as Soviet long-distance bombers could fly well above ground-based artillery. The Air Force continued using the western half of the facility for radar surveillance. The Eastern portion of the site was donated to New York State, but it remained unused because of its close proximity to a high-security facility.

During 1958 Montauk AFS joined the Semi Automatic Ground Environment (SAGE) system, feeding data to DC-01 at McGuire AFB, New Jersey.  After joining, the squadron was redesignated as the 773d Radar Squadron (SAGE) on  1 October 1958. It was also a major part of the NORAD defense system, so security was very tight. Montauk AFS was state of the art and many new systems were developed or tested there including magnetic memory for storage, light pens, keyboards, WANs (Wide area networks) and modular circuit packaging.

Montauk was the operational parent station for Texas Tower 3 (TT-3) offshore in the Atlantic Ocean from June 1958-25 March 1963. TT-3 was operated as an annex of the 773d AC&W Sq, with its offshore personnel assigned to a flight of the 773d, although the facility was logistically supported by the 4604th Support Squadron (Texas Towers) at Otis AFB.

In December 1960 the large, high-power AN/FPS-35 radar became operational at Montauk. It also used "frequency diversity" technology making it resistant to electronic countermeasures. The AN/FPS-35 was so powerful that it disrupted local TV and radio broadcasts, and had to be shut down several times and re-calibrated. The problems caused this radar to be taken out of service temporarily in 1961. With the problems resolved, the radar was operational again in 1962 and by 1963 an AN/FPS-26 had replaced one of the AN/FPS-6 height-finder radars.

In 1963 the site also had become an FAA/ADC joint-use facility. Around 1965 the site was removed from joint-use status. On 31 July 1963, the site was redesignated as NORAD ID Z-45. In 1978 the Air Force submitted a proposal to the Carter Administration to close the base, as it was largely obsolete due to the emergence of orbital satellite reconnaissance technology. In  September 1979 as part of a general draw down of anti-aircraft forces by Aerospace Defense Command Montauk AFS was transferred to Tactical Air Command and became part of ADTAC.

In addition to the main facility, Montauk AFS operated two unmanned AN/FPS-14 Gap Filler sites:
 Manorville, NY   (P-45A) 
 Chilmark, MA     (P-45B) 
Both sites opened in 1957. They were closed in June 1968. The Manorville site remains, although abandoned with vegetation growing over the facility. The Chilmark site is now obliterated.

The installation, which had also supplied long-range radar data for the Federal Aviation Administration (FAA) since 1962, was kept operational until a new facility operated by the (FAA) in Riverhead, New York was ready for use.

The Montauk installation was shut down on January 31, 1981.  Considering its size, removing the huge antenna was problematic at best so it was "abandoned in place", with its controlling motors and electronics removed, allowing it to move with the wind to prevent it being torn off its base in a storm. A GATR (Ground Air Transmitter Receiver) facility remained in service to direct military aircraft operating within the region. This system was deactivated and removed in 1984. Riverhead now controls all air traffic in the area.

Air Force units and assignments

Units 
 Constituted as the 773d Aircraft Control and Warning Squadron on 14 November 1950
 Activated on 27 November 1950
 Redesignated 773d Radar Squadron (SAGE) on 1 October 1958
 Redesignated  773d Radar Squadron on 1 February 1974
 Inactivated on 31 March 1981.

Assignments 
 503d Aircraft Control and Warning Group, 1 June 1948
 26th Air Division, 6 February 1952
 4709th Defense Wing (later 4709th Air Defense Wing), 16 February 1953
 4707th Air Defense Wing, 1 March 1956
 4709th Air Defense Wing, 8 July 1956
 4621st Air Defense Wing (later New York Air Defense Sector), 18 October 1956
 21st Air Division, 1 April 1966
 35th Air Division, 1 December 1967
 21st Air Division, 19 November 1969 – 31 March 1981
Source

Post-military use

See also 
 Montauk Point land claim
 Seacoast defense in the United States
 United States Army Coast Artillery Corps
 Montauk Project
 List of alleged conspiracy theories
 List of USAF Aerospace Defense Command General Surveillance Radar Stations
 List of United States Air Force aircraft control and warning squadrons

References

Notes
 Explanatory notes

 Citations

Bibliography

External links 
 List of all US coastal forts and batteries at the Coast Defense Study Group, Inc. website
 FortWiki, lists most CONUS and Canadian forts
Disinformation Archive: The Montauk Project – links
Camp Hero, Montauk Point, NY
Radomes.org Camp Hero, NY and Montauk AFS, NY

Installations of the United States Air Force in New York (state)
Aerospace Defense Command military installations
East Hampton (town), New York
Semi-Automatic Ground Environment sites
1942 establishments in New York (state)
1981 disestablishments in New York (state)
Military installations established in 1942
Military installations closed in 1981